Laurence Howard Eldredge (March 18, 1902 – July 17, 1982) was a lawyer, educator and author. His specialty was the law of torts.

Early life and education
Eldredge was born in Cold Spring, Cape May County, New Jersey on March 18, 1902 to Irvin H. and Mary Louise (Benton) Eldridge. He received a Bachelor of Science from Lafayette College in 1924 and a Bachelor of Laws from the University of Pennsylvania in 1927. In 1970, he completed a Doctor of Letters.

Career
Eldredge was a reporter for the Public Ledger in Philadelphia from 1924-25 and then a writer of syndicated news articles. He was admitted to the Pennsylvania Bar in 1927 and worked as an associated with Montgomery and McCracken until 1938. He was a member of the firm Norris, Lex, Hart & Eldredge from 1944 to 1956.

Eldredge was a Professor of Law at Temple University from 1928-33 and an Adjunct Professor from 1947-52. He was Special Deputy Attorney General of Pennsylvania from 1948 to 1949.

During the 1970s Eldridge taught torts at Hastings College of Law in San Francisco as a member of that school's 65 Club consisting of professors who were past retirement age and unable to teach elsewhere.

Bibliography
 Eldredge on Modern Tort Problems, 1941
 Pennsylvania Annotations to Restatement, Torts, Vols. I and II, 1938
 Trials of a Philadelphia Lawyer, 1968
 The Law of Defamation, 1978.
 Revising reporter, Restatement of the Law of Torts, 1946-47. 
 Reporter of decisions Supreme Court of Pennsylvania, 1942-68. 
 Editor: Pennsylvania Bar Assn. Quar., 1938-42.

Personal life
Eldredge married Helen Biddle Gans on September 30, 1926 and they had three daughters.

References

External links
 
 University of Pennsylvania Archives- Laurence H. Eldredge Papers

American lawyers

1902 births
1982 deaths